Thout 17 - Coptic Calendar - Thout 19

The eighteenth day of the Coptic month of Thout, the first month of the Coptic year. On a common year, this day corresponds to September 15, of the Julian Calendar, and September 28, of the Gregorian Calendar. This day falls in the Coptic season of Akhet, the season of inundation.

Commemorations

Feasts 
 The Feast of the Cross (Day 2)

Saints 
 The Martyrdom of Saint Prophorius 
 The Martyrdom of Saint Stephen the Presbyter and Saint Niketa

References 

Days of the Coptic calendar